Gustav Andreas Tammann (24 July 1932 – 6 January 2019) was a German astronomer and academic. He served as director of the Astronomical Institute of the University of Basel; as a member of the European Space Agency Space Telescope Advisory Team, and as Member of Council of the European Southern Observatory. His research interests include supernovae and the extragalactic distance scale. Tammann was a former President of the International Astronomical Union Commission on Galaxies.

Education and early career
Tammann studied astronomy in Basel, Switzerland and Göttingen, Germany. In 1963 he began a longtime working relationship with Allan Sandage at the Mount Wilson and Palomar observatories.

Academic career
In 1972 he became a professor at the University of Hamburg. From 1977 until his retirement, he was a professor and head of the Astronomical Institute at the University of Basel.

Tammann is the grandson of the physical chemist Gustav Tammann.

Accolades
In 1991 Tammann became a full member of Academia Europaea, and in 1993 became a corresponding member of the Heidelberg Academy of Sciences and Humanities. In 2000 he received the Albert Einstein Medal that is given for "outstanding scientific findings, works, or publications related to Albert Einstein" and the Tomalla Prize for his efforts in measuring the expansion rate of the universe and especially for his pioneering work using Supernovae as standard candles. In 2005 received the Karl Schwarzschild Medal.

The asteroid 18872 Tammann was named for him in 2001.

References

External links 
Gustav A. Tammann

20th-century Swiss astronomers
Albert Einstein Medal recipients
1932 births
2019 deaths
German Christians
Swiss Christians
People of Baltic German descent
20th-century German astronomers
21st-century Swiss astronomers
Academic staff of the University of Hamburg